is a Japanese manga series by Akira Kojima. It was serialized in Square Enix' Monthly Gangan WING manga magazine between January 2000 and July 2006, spanning a total of 12 tankōbon volumes.

An anime television series adaptation, entitled , was animated by J.C.Staff, aired on TV Tokyo from January 10, 2005, to June 26, 2005, spanning a total of 26 episodes.

Plot
Shiratori Ryushi wants to become a children's picture book writer, and he moves to an apartment, Narutaki-Sou (Narutaki Villa), in order to go to an art school in Tokyo. Narutaki-Sou is an old Japanese style one-story house which doesn't fit in urban scenery. The complex is owned by his mother's cousin and the manager of the apartment is his second cousin, Aoba Kozue. They met each other when they were children, although Shiratori doesn't remember much of it. Kozue is in the second grade of a high school attached to Aoba Junior College.

There are seven residents of Narutaki-Sou. The first, Chanohata Tamami, lives in room #1 and she is Kozue's childhood friend and best friend. Shiratori Ryushi, the main character of the series, resides in room #2. In room #3 resides Momono Megumi, a person who goes her own way in life. Kurosaki Sayoko and her daughter Asami, who is in the first grade of middle school, live in room #5. Finally, in room #6, Haibara Yukio lives with his puppet Johnny.

Narutaki-Sou is filled with characteristic and eccentric people. However, the most eccentric person is Kozue herself. She has a secret of which even she does not know; when she is shocked at something, her personality changes. Not knowing this, Ryushi moves to Narutaki-Sou to realize his dream.

Characters

Narutaki Sou residents
Note: All characters are voiced by Satomi Arai.

 
Landlady of Narutaki Sou and Ryūshi's 16-year-old second cousin. She attends the same high school as Tamami. She has several different personalities that come out when she experiences different emotions, but returns to her original one after sleeping or passing out. In the manga, she begins going out with Ryūshi in chapter 39. Near the end of the manga, it is revealed that the cause of her different personalities is her sad past where she lost everyone that she loved, starting with the death of her great grandfather and her later abandonment by her parents. It is further revealed that her other personalities were influenced by the 10-year-old Ryūshi who showed her his drawings and taught her that people can be anything in their imagination.

In the epilogue, it is shown that she and Ryūshi are married and have four kids, each of them similar to one of her four alternate personalities.

 
Saki has a tough attitude and is very strong physically. Despite this, she actually does care about others, even if she is embarrassed to admit it. She appears when Kozue is surprised or angered. She is an extreme lightweight, and unable to tolerate anything but umeshu (in the manga), in the anime she can't even smell liquor without passing out.

  
Nanako is usually better behaved after she becomes "Shiny". One other noteworthy feature of Nanako is that of all the other personalities that Kozue goes through, Nanako is the only one given an actual age. According to the manga, Saki, Chiyuri, and Natsume all are of unknown age, though it is safe to assume that all of the others have the same age as Kozue.

 
Chiyuri loves cosplay and also makes everyone else cosplay against their will, but only if it is against their will. If they don't care or want to do so, she doesn't want to. She appears when Kozue is clumsy or frightened. While she is in this personality, Tamami acts as her assistant, whom Chiyuri refers to as "my partner", while supplying Tamami many embarrassing photo-ops with which to fill her camera. Tamami, in return, calls Chiyuri "my sweetheart". "Correct!" is her catchphrase.

 
Natsume has a very shy personality who initially avoided speaking to anyone at all. She is extremely skilled at sleight of hand and card tricks. The first time she talked was when teaching Ryushi a trick. Flowers will spontaneously pop out of the top of her head when she's happy. She has a habit of ending her sentences with "kamo", meaning either "maybe" or "I think" depending on the context.

By room number
  
 
Tamami is close friends and classmates with Aoba Kozue. She always has a camera and likes to take pictures of Kozue in embarrassing situations. She is also an inactive member ("Ghost member") of the occult club, along with Kozue. Tamami is very strong physically, although she appears quite normal, if not short and weak. A perpetually smiling evil genius, Tamami is cold, sarcastic, cruel, manipulative, inconsiderate and condescending towards those she deem to be her moral/intellectual inferiors; which in other words mean everybody besides Kozue-Chan and her other personalities. This is explained by her usually being isolated for her extreme genius before meeting Kozue. Tamami goes to Seika Tandai Fuzoku High School with Kozue, and has a habit of saying "desu" at the end of her sentences. In the manga, it is revealed that she is actually a very emotional person, crying all the while during Momono's departure. At the end of the manga, she becomes a world-class photographer who frequently travels oversea.

 
 
The main protagonist of the series, who is an aspiring children's book artist. Ryūshi moved into Narutaki Sou so he could attend the Sumeragi Design School in Tokyo. Aoba Kozue is his second cousin. He met Kozue when they were younger, but doesn't remember this at the start of the series. He is childish and passive to the point of never objecting when anyone does anything wrong to him, which happens a lot. In the epilogue, he is shown to have married Aoba Kozue, with four daughters, possibly representing Aoba's former personalities.

 
 
Megumi attended Washida University for one year, but it turned out to be too expensive, so she took a year off. Her hairstyle features an ahoge. She stays at Narutaki Sou all the time and is in a long distance relationship with her middle school boyfriend who is studying cinema overseas. She's also a heavy drinker, and likes to party with Johnny in Shiratori's room, much to his dismay. In the epilogue, she is shown with one daughter, Ruri, who is a fan of Ryūshi's children's books. In the anime, she remains at Sou Narutaki, telling her boyfriend to ask her to join him again once he has finished his studies and fulfilled his dreams.

 
 
Sayoko has a very dark personality and is not very responsible. Her father is a rich and talented sculptor, with whom she became estranged in her youth over her choice of her husband; rather than let her parents choose a fiancé for her, she eloped with the estate's gardener. Her favorite food is Mizuyōkan. Despite her evident uselessness throughout the series, she really cares for Asami.

  
 
Asami lives in room 5 with only her adopted mother since her adopted father died when she was younger. She keeps things together in spite of her mother's problems, pulling most of the workload at home and keeping track of expenses.

  
 

Yukio doesn't speak directly, but rather uses ventriloquism to speak through his puppet, Johnny. In the anime, he is at one point mistaken for Aleister Crowley by Vermilion, to his and Johnny's considerable distress. Yukio Haibara became Kozue's caretaker after her parents abandoned her at Narutaki Sou. In the manga, Haibara speaks using his own voice only once when he expresses his hope that Shiratori can heal Kozue.

 
 
Yukio Haibara's hand puppet of a brown dog through whom Yukio speaks using ventriloquism. They both act as if the puppet were really the one speaking; Johnny often "speaks" as if Haibara is the extra part. It is revealed near the end of the manga that Johnny was "born" when Haibara was at a loss as to how to get the sad and lonely Kozue to talk to him after her parents left her.

Sumeragi (Imperial) Design School
 is Shiratori's teacher. Students who are disobedient or forget their homework are subjected to "the mysterious closet", which apparently is a frightful ordeal. She has a habit of having her eyes half open and talking very cheerfully until certain moments. At one point she and Tamami meet and get along quite well, much to the others' terror. She typically wears kimono and "normal" clothes on festivals.
 is Shiratori's classmate who is always trying to charm high school girls and young women. He happened to meet Shiratori when he was dressed as a girl due to a prank and fell in love with "her". Without a name to call this newfound love, he nicknamed her "Reiko", not realizing that she was really Shiratori. Voiced by: 
 is Shiratori's classmate who wears glasses. Her name is based on the famous bank in Japan "Resona Bank". A devoted fan of manga (especially yaoi and yuri manga), Risona aims to become a dojinshi author. She has a fear of white goats eating her manga manuscripts. Voiced by: Riku Moriyama
 is Shiratori's classmate who uses her batting skills to punish Tsubasa for his womanizing. She normally uses a spiked baseball bat, but because of the adults' circumstances, her bat was taken away and replaced with a plastic megaphone. In the epilogue of the manga, she is shown to have become an editor, despite studying to be an author. Voiced by: Nozomi Masu

Seika Tandai Fuzoku High School
 (Voiced by:Shizuka Itō)
She is the head of the occult research lab, of which Tamami, as well as Kozue are technically members. She is never named and only referred to as "" until the final chapter of the manga. "Erika Vermillion" is a stage name for her fortune-telling business. She has a masochistic slant as well, and enjoys Tamami's talent for insults and other unusual tortures. When at a shrine, she is strangely purified into a person exactly opposite (bright and kind, to a point of using a lot of money to wish for happiness of everyone).

 (Voiced by: Sayaka Kinoshita)
Orchestra club president and conductor, who is the younger sister of Sakura.

Asami's Classmates
 is Asami's classmate and speaks in Kaisai dialect. She tries to keep control of Mi-chan's haughty attitude, often using heavy texts such as dictionaries or telephone books as punishment. Voiced by: Akeno Watanabe
 is Asami's classmate and is rich and slightly snobby, often having a blase attitude and striking old-fashioned poses with her fan. Even if Michiyo won't freely admit it, she just wants to be friends with Asami. Voiced by: Riku Moriyama

Futaba Ginza shops

She works for the bakery, which is famous for its taiyaki.

She works for the bakery, but is notorious for going through several, vastly unrelated jobs in quick succession — most likely because she is known for frequent slip-ups. She was previously a department jewelry store clerk, fortune teller, lifeguard, and various other jobs. She calls herself Hanako Suzuki. 

Grocer / Yaonaga
He runs various prize games with items such as futon warmers and refrigerators as prizes. He often tells bad jokes and puns, mostly for his own amusement.
Book Store

Minazuki residence
Ushimitsu Minazuki (水無月 丑三 Minazuki Ushimitsu;)
Sayoko's father and an established and wealthy sculptor. He has a tendency to be controlling.

Yu Minazuki (水無月 夕 Minazuki Yū; voiced by: Kotono Mitsuishi)
Sayoko's mother, who cannot stand sunlight, and is therefore much more active at night. Yū Minazuki walks with a cane, which she applies to her husband's feet when he is rude.

Mahiru Minazuki (水無月 まひる Minazuki Mahiru)
Sayoko's younger sister and Asami's aunt, though they are closer to sisters in terms of their relationship. Mahiru Minazuki has been living in Italy since childhood, so she is somewhat awkward at speaking Japanese. She speaks little, and tends to employ a kind of formal monotone when she does.

The senior maid of the Minazuki household. She is an extremely skilled maid and is a capable martial artist and especially skilled with projectile weapons such as darts. Despite her tough appearance, she has a soft spot for things like teddy bears. She is very conscious of her height, thinking herself to be too tall (at the shrine, her wish is to shrink). She is extremely protective of Mahiru.

Sakura Utsugi (空木 桜 Utsugi Sakura; voiced by: Yuka Inokuchi)
A maid of the Minazuki household. While her heart is in the right place, she is extremely careless and clumsy, a flaw which often lands her in trouble. In the epilogue, her little sister works as a maid in the house with her.

Chauffeur
The personal chauffeur of the Minazuki household.

Other characters
Tobita Haruka
An artist who happens across Sayoko's carvings. After multiple attempts to track her down, she is now producing and selling sculptures with Sayoko whom she considers to be a genius.

Sidestories
Children's storybook sidestory

Ryushi Shiratori's children's story that is seen many times throughout the anime involves the story of a prince. The prince, who is a representation of Ryushi himself, discovers a castle with a princess living in it. The princess has a fondness for umeboshi and for various reasons concerning umeboshi, she multiplies into other princesses. These new princesses are the representations of Kozue, Saki, Chiyuri, Nanako and Natsume and the princesses appear in the same episode as each of the new personalities are introduced.

Comic panel sidestory

Often during the anime a vertical comic-style sketch related to the main story is shown. The art style and music are consistently used in this way as various situations are shown for comedic purposes. Each panel is displayed for several seconds until the next panel scrolls into view.

Manga

Anime

Episodes
Welcome to Narutaki-sou (ようこそ鳴滝荘へ)
The Landlady's Secret (大家さんのひみつ)
The Precious Place (たいせつな場所)
Warm and Fuzzy (ぬくぬく)
Nega-Posi (ネガポジ)
Tama Check (珠チェック)
Hide and Seek (かくれんぼ)
Shopping (おかいモノ)
Correct-o (これくと)
Sketch (スケッチ)
Affection (想い...)
Summer! Swimsuits! The Beach! (夏だ!水着だ!海水浴だ!)
Narutaki-sou's Treasure (鳴滝荘のタカラモノ)
The End of Summer (夏の終わりに)
...Maybe (...かも)
Guests After Guests (千客万来)
Color of the Sky (そらのいろ)
Meow Meow Meow (にゃーにゃーにゃー)
Everyone's Day (みんなの一日)
School Festival (学園祭にて)
Mother and Daughter (親·子)
Important... (大事...)
Among the Red Leaves (紅葉の中で)
Bells (すず)
Night of Revelation (告げる夜)
Heartful Days

Theme songs
Opening

Daiji Da·I·Ji (大事▽Da·I·Ji) by Saiki Mia and Shiraishi Ryoko

Ending

Boku no SPEED de (僕のスピードで) by Chihiro Yonekura

Together with King Records (Starchild label).

Mahotarot
A set of 22 tarot cards with Mahoraba's characters exist. The drawings are done by the author, and in addition to original cards, others such as mass-production versions (simplified background), fake tarot cards (different pictures for card number), and special editions (holographic) exist. These are supplements for related merchandises, and cannot be collected in its entirety solely by buying the books; thus, it is hard to complete the collection.

References

External links
 Mahoraba ~Heartful Site (Archived): Anime official website
 Mahoraba: Manga official site
 TV Tokyo Anime X-Press Mahoraba ~ Heartful days

2000 manga
2005 Japanese television series debuts
2005 Japanese television series endings
Discotek Media
Dissociative identity disorder in popular culture
Gangan Comics manga
J.C.Staff
Odex
Shōnen manga
TV Tokyo original programming